Redbergslids IK (RIK), is a handball team from Gothenburg, Sweden founded in 1916. Redbergslids is the most successful club in Sweden, having won 20 Swedish Championship titles. Home games are played in Prioritet Serneke Arena.

Redbergslid is the only Scandinavian club to win the EHF Champions League (1959). They also reached the final of the EHF Cup Winner's Cup in 2003.

Noted players of the club include Peter Gentzel, Stefan Lövgren, Ljubomir Vranjes, Magnus Wislander and Andreas Palicka.

Sports Hall information

Name: – Prioritet Serneke Arena
City: – Göteborg
Capacity: – 550
Address: – Krutvägen 2-4, 415 28 Gothenburg, Sweden

Kits

Team

Current squad
Squad for the 2021-22 season

Goalkeepers
1  Oscar Sävinger
 12  Kristian Zetterlund
 16  Andreas Palicka
Left Wingers
 11  Anton Schultze
 13  Ludvig Högberg
Right Wingers
  Oliver Wigmark
 10  Marko Lasica
 17  Carl Hamberg
Line players
4  Mario Lipovac
7  William Höghielm
 23  Oskar Ysander

Left Backs
2  Oskar Joelsson
3  Elliot Stenmalm
 18  Arvid Engström
Central Backs
6  Anton Gustafsson
9  Linus Lövgren
Right Backs
8  Tobias Johansson
 15  Alvin Sirén

Transfers for the 2022–23 season

Joining

Leaving
  Andreas Palicka (GK) (to  Paris Saint-Germain)
  Elliot Stenmalm (LB) (to  Łomża Vive Kielce)
  Oscar Sävinger (GK) (to  IK Sävehof)

Accomplishments
Handbollsligan: 20
: 1933, 1934, 1947, 1954, 1958, 1963, 1964, 1965, 1985, 1986, 1987, 1989, 1993, 1995, 1996, 1997, 1998, 2000, 2001, 2003
EHF Champions League: 1
: 1959
EHF Cup Winners' Cup:
: 2003

References

External links
 
 

Swedish handball clubs
Sports clubs in Gothenburg
1916 establishments in Sweden
Handball clubs established in 1916